The Russian post offices abroad were established by Russia between the late 18th and early 20th centuries to handle mail service where the local service was deemed unreliable. The first such were the Russian post offices in the Ottoman (Turkish) Empire, which began operations in the 1770s. All the post offices closed during the 1910s.

Mail from some of the post offices is scarce. There is only one known piece of mail from the Russian post office in Ulankom, for instance, which was discovered by Michel Liphschutz in the 1940s.

Russian Post currently maintains a post office in Berlin.

See also
Postage stamps and postal history of Russia
 Russian post offices in China
 Russian post offices in Crete
 Russian post offices in the Ottoman Empire

References and sources

References

Sources
 Stanley Gibbons Ltd: various catalogues
 AskPhil – Glossary of Stamp Collecting Terms
 Encyclopaedia of Postal History
Rossiter, Stuart & John Flower. The Stamp Atlas. London: Macdonald, 1986.